Volnovakha Raion is one of the 18 administrative raions (a district) of Donetsk Oblast, located in southeastern Ukraine. The administrative center of the district is located in the city of Volnovakha. Population:

History
On 9 December 2014, the Verkhovna Rada, Ukraine's national parliament, changed the boundaries and total area of the Volnovakha Raion to encompass  following the events surrounding the War in Donbass. Subsequently, the Governor of Donetsk Oblast Oleksandr Kikhtenko adopted a resolution moving the administrative center of Novoazovsk Raion to the settlement of Vynohradne; the administrative center of Telmanove Raion to the urban-type settlement of Myrne; and the administrative center of Yasynuvata Raion to the urban-type settlement of Ocheretyne.

On 18 July 2020, as part of the administrative reform of Ukraine, the number of raions of Donetsk Oblast was reduced to eight, of which only five were controlled by the government, and the area of Volnovakha Raion was significantly expanded.  The January 2020 estimate of the raion population was

Demographics 
According to the 2001 Ukrainian Census,

Localities 
 Zachativka
 Zelenyi Hai

References

External links
 Official website of the Volnovakha District State Administration

Raions of Donetsk Oblast
1923 establishments in Ukraine